Parasa darma is a moth of the family Limacodidae. It is found in Burma, Sundaland, Palawan and Taiwan.

The wingspan is 21–31 mm.

The larvae feed on Cocos species. They are green with blue bands.

References

Moths described in 1859
Limacodidae
Moths of Asia
Taxa named by Frederic Moore